Flirting with Disaster is a 2011 studio album by Jill Johnson produced by Amir Aly, allowing Johnson to score her first number-one album in Sweden.

Track listing

Charts

References

2011 albums
Jill Johnson albums